This is a list of banks in Laos.

Central bank 
 Bank of the Lao P.D.R.

Commercial banks

Government-owned banks

Private banks

Defunct bank(s) 

 Lao Construction Bank (LCB)

Foreign banks

References

External links
 Bank of the Lao P.D.R.

Laos
Banks
Banks

Laos